John Riley Tanner (April 4, 1844 – May 23, 1901) was the 21st Governor of Illinois, from 1897 until 1901.

Tanner was the first governor in the country to be openly neutral in labor disputes, gaining national notoriety for his actions in a series of coal mine disputes. With the Spanish–American War looming, he was the only governor to raise and combat-equip a National Guard unit of African American soldiers led by African American officers.

Tanner's administration was capable and efficient, placing the state on a sound financial footing and passing significant legislation. However, he was constantly at odds with Chicago's political leaders, both Democratic and Republican, a feud that came to be symbolized by his signing of the infamous "Allen bill", which gave control of Chicago's intra-city transportation network to corrupt financier Charles Yerkes.

Tanner declined to seek a second term as governor, instead choosing to oppose the renomination of his former political ally, Shelby Cullom, as U.S. Senator. Tanner was badly defeated within his own party, ending his political career. He died less than five months after leaving office.

Early life 
John Riley Tanner was born on a farm near the town of Boonville in Warrick County, Indiana. His family moved to Illinois when he was a child, and he grew up on a farm near Carbondale. He enlisted in the 98th Illinois Infantry at the age of 19, during the Civil War, and saw service with Sherman's army. When the 98th Infantry was mustered out of service in June 1865, Tanner was transferred to the 61st Illinois Infantry, and was mustered out of service later that year. He then returned to southern Illinois and settled in Louisville, Illinois, where he farmed and entered into a partnership with his brother in a milling and lumber business. He married Lauretta Ingraham on Christmas Day 1866 and they had two children, Lucinda J. and J. Mack Tanner, but Lauretta died on October 22, 1887, at the age of 40.

Political rise 
Tanner would rise through Republican party ranks to become the unrivaled boss of a powerful political machine. In 1870 he began his long and successful political career in the Illinois Republican party of that era, winning elections and garnering appointments to increasingly important positions. He was first elected to the office of sheriff of Clay County, Illinois (1870–72), and afterwards became circuit court clerk for the county (1872–76). He was appointed master in chancery (i.e., a senior officer of the court) of the circuit court (1877–80), and then served two terms in the Illinois State Senate (1880–1883). Tanner was appointed United States marshal of the Southern District of Illinois by Republican President Chester A. Arthur, but was soon removed by incoming Democratic President Grover Cleveland.

Now prominent in statewide Illinois politics, Tanner was elected State Treasurer in 1886, and in 1891 he was appointed to the State Railroad and Warehouse Commission. In 1892 he was made Assistant Treasurer of the United States Treasury at Chicago, and was elected chairman of the Illinois State Republican Central Committee in 1894, a committee on which he had previously served as a member (1874–84).

As chairman, Tanner was at the head of his party in its heyday of state power and national influence, the boss of a well-oiled political machine that he had helped build. As such, he was instrumental in resuscitating the flagging political fortunes of U.S. Senator Shelby Moore Cullom within his own Republican party.

Tanner was a tireless worker and strong-willed party boss. Under his leadership during the 1896 political campaign, the entire Illinois Republican Party state ticket was elected, the party secured majorities in both branches of the state legislature, and eighteen of their twenty-two candidates for congressmen were elected. Tanner himself was elected governor, defeating incumbent John Peter Altgeld by a wide margin.

Administration 

Tanner led up to his inauguration in grand style with his marriage to the socially prominent Cora English on December 30, 1896. She was known for her interest in social reform and her outspoken support of her ideals, views that were shared by her husband.

John Tanner's administration was noteworthy in several respects. He placed the state on a sound financial footing, and significant legislation included the establishment of the State Board of Pardons, the State Board of Examiners of Architects, the offices of the State Food Commissioners and the State Commissioners of Game, and the Juvenile Court Act. Western Normal School was established at Macomb (originally a school for teachers, now Western Illinois University).

Tanner was also known for his antagonistic relationship with Chicago, and was often at loggerheads with its political bosses, both Democratic and Republican. The mutual hostility came to be symbolized by the "Allen bill", a legislation signed by Tanner which gave control of Chicago's intra-city transportation system to corrupt financier Charles Yerkes. Faced with long-term constraints that would virtually cripple many efforts to develop the city, Chicago was galvanized into instituting internal reforms and ensuring the bill's repeal.

Tanner was an active and unbiased patriot. When the Spanish–American War was declared, he was the first governor in the country to have the state militia ready to be called up into national service. Within 36 hours of President McKinley's call for volunteers, ten thousand equipped troops were ready for muster into the U.S. military.

Among Illinois' contributions were the 8th Illinois Volunteers, an African American regiment with African American officers and an African American commander; and when the President tried to dissuade him from recruiting African Americans, Tanner used his considerable influence to pressure the national government into calling up the regiment and sending them to Cuba, one of ten equipped Illinois regiments to be called up.

Tanner achieved national notoriety with his position on labor disputes at a time when they were characteristically numerous and violent, particularly in the Illinois coalfields. His position was non-partisanship, the first governor to make it a state policy. When violence broke out, he was quick to send state troops to quell the violence, and he was adamantly opposed to the importation of armed men by either side, using troops to enforce state laws against it. The most notable incidents of the day were at Virden (where imported armed men had fired on Illinois strikers), at Pana (racial strife between white and black coal miners, with the governor siding against the position of the white miners), and Carterville (where unarmed African Americans were shot by white miners, an incident vehemently condemned by the governor).

Legacy 

Tanner's early and untimely death meant that he would never be able to mend the ill feelings that resulted from his disputes within his own party, particularly those that arose from his challenge to Shelby Cullom immediately preceding his death. His relationship with Chicago politicians had been consistently antagonistic over the years, and they felt no inclination to remember him kindly.

He had personally opposed the use of violence against both companies and laborers in labor disputes, and had favored the elevation of African Americans from an inferior social position to one of equality. As neither principle was actively supported by successful politicians of either party, either before or after his term as governor, it is fair to attribute the principles to him personally, and to note that he was out-of-step with his nineteenth century contemporaries.

Tanner is affectionately remembered both by Organized Labor, and by the African Americans who benefited from his policies. Their donations in remembrance of him accounts for the grand tomb that was erected at his grave.

Quotes by and about Tanner

Workers' rights

Racial attitudes

References

Bibliography 

 
 
 
 
 
 
 
 
 
 
 
 
 
 
  – quoted in Illinois Governor John Riley Tanner by the National Governors Association
 
 
 
 
 

1844 births
1901 deaths
Republican Party governors of Illinois
Illinois sheriffs
Republican Party Illinois state senators
People of Illinois in the American Civil War
People from Louisville, Illinois
State treasurers of Illinois
United States Marshals
People from Warrick County, Indiana
19th-century American politicians